The 1980 CIAU Men's Soccer Championship was hosted by the University of New Brunswick. The UNB Red Shirts won the gold medal game against the Wilfrid Laurier Golden Hawks to claim the first men's soccer national championship in school history.

All-Canadians
First Team(1-11) and Second Team(12-22) with school and hometown.

Nationals
Semi-final

Final

References

U Sports men's soccer championship
Cis Mens Soccer Championship, 1980